Beethoven Was Deaf is a live album by Morrissey, recorded around the time of the tour for Your Arsenal. The songs were recorded live at Paris Zenith on 22 December 1992, except for the titles followed by a *, which were recorded live in London 2 days before. The sleeve notes incorrectly state that all songs are from the Paris concert. On 14 December 2010, it was announced that EMI had deleted this album along with World of Morrissey and Suedehead: The Best of Morrissey from its catalogue. Despite this, it is still available on streaming platforms.

Track listing
"You're the One for Me, Fatty" – 3:59 *
"Certain People I Know" – 2:57 *
"National Front Disco" – 6:05 *
"November Spawned a Monster" – 5:29      
"Seasick, Yet Still Docked" – 5:15
"The Loop" – 6:00
"Sister I'm a Poet" – 2:22       
"Jack the Ripper" – 4:13
"Such a Little Thing Makes Such a Big Difference" – 1:52      
"I Know It's Gonna Happen Someday" – 3:39
"We'll Let You Know" – 5:12 *
"Suedehead" – 4:05
"He Knows I'd Love to See Him" – 3:38 *   
"You're Gonna Need Someone on Your Side" – 3:35 * 
"Glamorous Glue" – 4:05 *
"We Hate It When Our Friends Become Successful" – 2:49

Etchings on vinyl

WOULD YOU RISK IT FOR A BISCUIT/none

This is a reference to a 1970s UK TV commercial for a chocolate-covered muesli bar called 'Swisskit' where a character would say "I'll risk it for a Swisskit" before skiing down a mountain and crashing.

Band
 Morrissey – vocals, maracas, tambourine
 Alain Whyte – guitars, backing vocals
 Boz Boorer – guitars
 Gary Day – bass guitar, double bass
 Spencer Cobrin – drums

References

Morrissey albums
1993 live albums
HMV albums